Aethalopteryx atrireta is a moth in the family Cossidae. It is found in Botswana and South Africa.

References

Moths described in 1910
Aethalopteryx
Moths of Africa